Dreadnoughts is a 1984 video game published by The Avalon Hill Game Company.

Gameplay
Dreadnoughts is a game in which the player must use a German ship to evade the British squadron and disrupt Allied shipping in World War II.

Reception
Johnny L. Wilson reviewed the game for Computer Gaming World, and stated that "there is much that is pleasing about the game. It is extremely enjoyable to play against the computer and truly experience (sometimes quite literally) the "fog" of war."

Reviews
Computer Gaming World - Nov, 1991

References

External links
Review in Commodore Power/Play
Review in Family Computing
Review in Electronic Games

1984 video games
Apple II games
Avalon Hill video games
Battle of the Atlantic
Commodore 64 games
Computer wargames
Naval video games
Turn-based strategy video games
Video games about Nazi Germany
Video games developed in the United States
World War II video games